Elaine Mulqueen (January 27, 1932 – May 22, 2012) was an American children's television host and personality in Chicago, Illinois.

Career

Mulqueen's career in television began in 1962, when she appeared in commercials for Coca-Cola on Bozo's Circus, while her husband, Jack Mulqueen, worked as a puppeteer.

In 1963, Mulqueen and her husband began hosting The Mulqueens on WGN-TV. Mulqueen appeared on stage as a pixie-like character named Pandora.  In 1965, the program moved to WBKB-TV (now WLS-TV), and the show was renamed Mulqueen's Kiddie A-Go-Go. Mulqueen continued to host in character as Pandora, while the show now featured live dancing to popular music. In 1966, the program moved to WCIU-TV and its name was shortened to Kiddie A-Go-Go. Several popular musical groups performed on the show, including The Four Seasons and New Colony Six. "Kiddie A-Go-Go" remained on WCIU until 1970.

In 1973, Mulqueen appeared in advertisements for the Chicago-area grocery chain Dominick's.

Death

On May 22, 2012, Mulqueen died of cancer at the age of 80.

References

1932 births
2012 deaths
American television actresses
American television personalities
American women television personalities
Deaths from cancer in Illinois
21st-century American women